Euthymius of Constantinople may refer to:

 Euphemius of Constantinople, also called Euthymius, Ecumenical Patriarch in 490–496
 Euthymius I of Constantinople, Ecumenical Patriarch in 907–912
 Euthymius of Constantinople (11th century) (fl. 1050) 
 Euthymius II of Constantinople, Ecumenical Patriarch in 1410–1416